Cortinellidae is an extinct taxonomic family of fossil sea snails.

References

Prehistoric gastropods